Golden Arrow or Golden Arrows may refer to:

Film
Golden Arrow (1935 film), Italian drama
The Golden Arrow (1936 film), American comedy
Golden Arrow (1949 film), British comedy
The Golden Arrow (1962 film), Italian peplum genre adventure

Sports
Golden Arrow (seaplane), 1929 Schneider Trophy racing aircraft; official name Gloster VI
Golden Arrows, South African football club founded 1943; full name Lamontville Golden Arrows F.C.

Transportation
Golden Arrow Bus Services, South African commuter bus operator in Cape Town; founded 1861
Golden Arrow (train), English luxury train which connected London and Dover between 1926 and 1972
Golden Arrow (Pennsylvania Railroad train), American passenger service between 1929 and 1946
Golden Arrow (car), British land speed record racer driven in 1929 by Henry Segrave
Abaris Golden Arrow, home-built aircraft design by Abaris Aircraft planned in 1990s

Other
The Golden Arrow prayer, prayer of Reparation revealed to French Carmelite nun in 1844
"Golden Arrow" (song), 1909 American popular song by Egbert Van Alstyne
The Golden Arrow (novel), 1916 romance by English romantic novelist Mary Webb
Golden Arrow (Scouting), peace symbol presented by Baden-Powell during 3rd World Scout Jamboree in 1929
Golden Arrow (comics), Fawcett Comics character in print from 1940 to 1953
Golden Arrow Award, Japanese accolade presented by Magazine Publishers Association between 1964 and 2008
 Golden Arrow (horse)

See also
Arrow (disambiguation)
Black Arrow (disambiguation)
Blue Arrow (disambiguation)
Green Arrow (disambiguation)
Pink Arrow (disambiguation)
Red Arrow (disambiguation)
Silver Arrow (disambiguation)
White Arrow (disambiguation)
Yellow Arrow (disambiguation)